The 12139/12140 Mumbai CSMT–Nagpur Sewagram Superfast Express is an Express train belonging to Indian Railways that runs between Mumbai CSMT and  in India.

It operates as train number 12139 from Mumbai CSMT to Nagpur Junction and as train number 12140 in the reverse direction.

Coaches

The 12139/40 Mumbai CSMT Nagpur Sewagram Superfast Express presently has 1 AC 2 tier, 3 AC 3 tier, 9 Sleeper Class & 5 General Unreserved coaches.

As with most train services in India, coach composition may be amended at the discretion of Indian Railways depending on demand.

Service

The 12139 Mumbai CSMT Nagpur Sewagram Superfast Express covers the distance of 837 kilometres in 15 hours 10 mins (55.19 km/hr) & in 15 hours 00 mins (55.80 km/hr) as 12140 Nagpur Mumbai CSMT Sewagram Superfast Express.

Routeing

Traction

Previously, dual-traction WCAM-3 locos hauled the train between Mumbai CSMT &  handing over to the Ajni-based WAP-7 locomotive which hauled the train until Nagpur Junction.

With Central Railway completing the change over of 1500 V DC traction to 25 kV AC traction on 6 June 2015, this train is now hauled end to end by Ajni-based WAP-7 locomotive.

Time Table

12139 Mumbai CSMT Nagpur–Sewagram Superfast Express leaves Mumbai CSMT daily at 15:00 hrs IST and reaches Nagpur Junction at 06:10 hrs IST the next day.

12140 Nagpur Mumbai CSMT–Sewagram Superfast Express leaves Nagpur Junction daily at 20:50 hrs IST and reaches Mumbai CSMT at 11:40 hrs IST the next day.

Gallery

External links

References 

Express trains in India
Rail transport in Maharashtra
Transport in Nagpur
Transport in Mumbai
Named passenger trains of India